FC Orsha is a football club based in Orsha, Vitebsk Oblast.

History
The team was founded in 1951 as Trud Orsha. The club was renamed to ZShM in 1956 and then to Mashinostroitel Orsha in 1960.

In 1965 the club was renamed to Start Orsha. The 60s and the 70s were the most successful years for the club, as they won the Vitebsk Oblast league in 1968, 1970, 1972 and 1977 as well as the Vitebsk Oblast cup in 1961, 1971, 1972 and 1976. In 1971, they reached the final of the Belarusian SSR Cup. They played in the Belarusian SSR top league from 1971 until 1985.

In 1992, the team was renamed to Legmash Orsha and joined the newly created Belarusian Second League. In 1994, the team was renamed to Maxim-Legmash Orsha due to sponsorship. After a successful 1995 season, Maxim-Legmash was promoted to the First League. Before the start of the 1996 season, the 'Legmash' part of the name was dropped due to Legmash plant withdrawal from team support and the team spent one season as Maxim-Orsha before being renamed again into FC Orsha in 1997. At the end of 2001, Orsha withdrew to the amateur level (Vitebsk Oblast championship) due to financial troubles.

The team returned in 2004, once again joining the Second League. The first post-return season was quite successful and Orsha was promoted to the First League for the 2005 season, but they quickly relegated back and since 2006 onwards, they've been playing in the Second League. In 2006, the team was known as Orsha-BelAutoService. Since 2014, they play in the First League.

Name changes
1951: founded as FC Trud Orsha
1956: renamed to FC ZShM Orsha
1960: renamed to FC Mashinostroitel Orsha
1965: renamed to FC Start Orsha
1992: renamed to FC Legmash Orsha
1995: renamed to FC Maxim-Orsha Orsha
1996: renamed to FC Maxim-Legmash Orsha
1997: renamed to FC Orsha
2006: renamed to FC Orsha-BelAutoService Orsha
2007: renamed to FC Orsha

Honours

Belarusian SSR cup
Runner-Up: 1971

Current squad
As of March 2023

References

External links

 
Football clubs in Belarus
Orsha
1951 establishments in Belarus
Association football clubs established in 1951